Old Town Manassas, or the Manassas Historic District, is a national historic district located at Manassas, Virginia. It encompasses 206 contributing buildings and 1 contributing object in the central business district and surrounding residential area of city of Manassas.

Historic designation

The Manassas Historic District was added to the National Register of Historic Places in 1988.

Residential areas

Residential areas include dwellings in a variety of popular late-19th and early-20th century architectural styles. These range from Italianate, Second Empire and Queen Anne styles, to the Craftsman and American Foursquare styles.

Notable buildings

Notable buildings include the former Manassas Presbyterian Church (1875); the former All Saints Roman Catholic Church (1878); the Sillington, Hazen Building, formerly the National Bank of Manassas (1896); the former Hopkins Candy Factory (1908-1909); the old Manassas Town Hall; the Trinity Episcopal Church (1922); the Grace Methodist Church (1926); and the Norfolk-Southern Railway passenger station (1914).  Also located in the district is the separately listed Prince William County Courthouse.  Associated with the courthouse is the contributing monument commemorating the Peace Jubilee (1911).

References

External links
  Visitmanassas.org: Historic Old Town Manassas

Manassas, Virginia
Historic districts in Northern Virginia
Historic districts on the National Register of Historic Places in Virginia
National Register of Historic Places in Manassas, Virginia
Buildings and structures in Manassas, Virginia
Victorian architecture in Virginia